Eugene C. Figg (August 4, 1936 – March 20, 2002) was an American structural engineer who made numerous contributions to the field of structural engineering, especially in the design of the cable-stayed bridge and the use of the segmental concrete construction method.

Life
Figg was born August 4, 1936 in Charleston, South Carolina. He received a civil engineering degree as a structural engineer from The Citadel in Charleston in 1958.

During his career, he brought the use of the segmental method for spanning large gaps to the United States with the assistance of his Paris-based partner, Jean M. Muller. His affiliation with Muller, begun at Figg and Muller Engineers (founded in 1978), allowed him to gain valuable insight into the application of pre-cast segmental bridge construction methods to the domestic market. When they coupled this construction method with cable-stayed supports, Mueller and Figg effectively increased the use of concrete in longer span bridge proposals.

He formed his own engineering firm, the Figg Engineering Group, still operating and based in Tallahassee. Figg also founded the American Segmental Bridge Institute in 1989, and served four years as a trustee at the National Building Museum.

Awards 
In 2000, Figg was honored with the John A. Roebling Medal for his outstanding lifetime achievement in bridge engineering.

Famous bridges
 Sunshine Skyway Bridge
 Linn Cove Viaduct
 Natchez Trace Parkway Bridge

See also
 List of civil engineers

References

Bibliography 
 ASCE – American Society of Civil Engineers. (2002) “2002 OPAL Recipients – Eugene C. Figg, Jr.” <https://web.archive.org/web/20070930180918/http://www.asce.org/opal/2002_figg.cfm> (March 20, 2007)
 Auburn Alumni Association. (2007) “ALUM Spotlight Linda Figg ’81” Auburn University Alumni Spotlight <https://web.archive.org/web/20070428051014/http://www.aualum.org/alumni/spotlight.html> (March 20, 2007)
 Brassfield, Mike. (2002) “’Visionary’ engineer’s legacy spans bay area”  St. Petersburg Times (St. Petersburg, Florida).  <http://www.sptimes.com/2002/03/22/TampaBay/_Visionary__engineer_.shtml> (March 20, 2007)
 Bridge Design & Engineering. (2002) “New Bridge Award Created in Honour of Eugene Figg”  <https://web.archive.org/web/20061110084859/http://www.bridgeweb.com/news/NewsDetails.cfm?ArticleID=55> (March 20, 2007)
 Burgess, M. (2005).  “Precast, Prestressed Bridges.” Precast Prestressed Concrete Institute, <https://web.archive.org/web/19961220081344/http://www.pci.org/> (March 22, 2007).
 Ensley, Gerald. (2002) “Bridge designer Eugene Figg dies at 65.” Tallahassee Democrat (Tallahassee, Florida).  <http://www.accessmylibrary.com/coms2/summary_0286-8641099_ITM> (March 20, 2007)
 Marsh, Don. (2002) "Gene Figg: A master of market development." Concrete Products 105.5: 8. OmniFile Full Text Mega. H. W. Wilson. Karmann Library – University of Wisconsin Platteville, Platteville, WI. <http://vnweb.hwwilsonweb.com/> (February 10, 2007)
 Pittman, C. (2001). Bridge inspectors unscathed. Retrieved April 13, 2009, from St. Petersburg Times: <http://www.sptimes.com/News/061101/State/Bridge_inspectors_uns.shtml>
 Vogel, Mike. (2006) “Making a Connection.”  Florida Trend
 Wilson, Bill. (2000) "A brush with greatness." Roads & Bridges 38.8: 28.
 Zeyher, Allen. (2002) “SPANNING THE NEWS.”  Roads & Bridges 40.4: 8.

1936 births
2002 deaths
The Citadel, The Military College of South Carolina alumni
20th-century American engineers
Structural engineers